Krzysztof Gawlik (born 1965 in Świerczyna) is a Polish serial killer, nicknamed "Scorpio". He killed 5 people.

Life 
Gawlik was born in Świerczyna. His father was a miner, and his mother took care of the house. He experienced violence from an early age. His father, when not at work, drank alcohol and beat his wife. After finishing school, Gawlik was employed in the "Julia" coal mine in Wałbrzych, where he worked until 1994, when it was closed. Gawlik then set up his own company, which, however, did not bring the expected profits.

Murders 
Krzysztof Gawlik got his nickname from murdering people with the Škorpion type silenced machine gun. Each victim was shot several times with a characteristic execution shot in the back of the head, along with some stabbing traces on the body. Gawlik's first victim was an almost 18-year-old prostitute Sylwia L. from Poznań. The murderer met her (apparently) on February 6, 2001, responding to an advertisement she placed in the press. The next victim of "Scorpio" was a Ukrainian - Lesia H., a prostitute working in Wrocław and Tomasz S., a man associated with her. He shot them three days after committing the first crime, according to various sources in a public house of their apartment in Wrocław. In March 2001, Gawlik killed another two people - a married couple from Wrocław, whom he most likely found by responding to their car sales offer.

Arrest and trial 
Gawlik was detained at the end of March 2001, when under the influence of alcohol he caused an accident and tried to flee from the scene. The police discovered a pistol with a silencer in his car, which was used to commit the five homicides. Gawlik initially confessed to the killings; he claimed that he first started killing in 1998 because he enjoyed to watch people die in front of his eyes. The trial began in 2002. However, Gawlik withdrew his testimony, and claimed that he only killed one person, that he was witness to three murders, and that he had nothing to do with the Poznań murder. He also claimed that the murder he committed was carried out on behalf of a certain amount of profit and drug trafficking.

He was sentenced to life imprisonment with limited possibilities for conditional release, which he could apply for not earlier than fifty years, while the prosecutor demanded a 40-year limitation. Gawlik did not show remorse, then against the wishes of his lawyer, gave up the right to appeal, which is a sensation in the event of a conviction for such a long sentence, thus losing the right for any chance of release, because the dates set for it passed.

Punishment 
Gawlik is imprisoned in the Wołów Prison. In 2004, during a search of his cell, prison guards prevented him from escaping prison. Using a tube and a flat bar torn from the bed, he tried to convert the cell wall. According to the officers, his plan would have been short of success.

See also 
 List of serial killers by country

References 

1965 births
Living people
Male serial killers
Polish murderers of children
Polish people convicted of murder
Polish serial killers